Mustapha Berraf (born 21 February 1954) is an Algerian sports official and executive who currently serves as the President of the Association of National Olympic Committees of Africa (ANOCA). He has been serving in that role since 2018.

References 

Living people
1954 births
International Olympic Committee members